Ancylosis atrisparsella is a species of snout moth in the genus Ancylosis. It was described by George Hampson in 1901 and is known from South Africa. and Namibia.

References

Moths described in 1901
atrisparsella
Insects of Namibia
Moths of Africa